The Lone Star Flight Museum, located in Houston, Texas, is an aerospace museum that displays more than 24 historically significant aircraft, and many artifacts related to the history of flight. The museum's collection is rare because most of the aircraft are flyable. Located at Ellington Airport, the museum is housed on about 100,000 ft2 (10,000 m2) of property, including its own airport ramp. The museum, formerly located in Galveston, moved to Houston to avoid a repeat of the devastation suffered during Hurricane Ike.

History

The museum began as a private collection of historic aircraft in 1985. By 1990, that collection had grown enough that its owner decided to place them on public display. The Lone Star Flight Museum, a non-profit organization funded entirely through private donations, was formed for that purpose.

2008 damage and restoration

The museum reported heavy damage from Hurricane Ike, stating on September 16, 2008, that the hangars and Hall of Fame had received seven to eight feet of water and the lobby three to four. Damaged aircraft included a TB-58A and F-100 on loan from the US Air Force Museum, Consolidated PBY-5A, Consolidated PB4Y-2 Privateer, de Havilland DH-82A, Grumman F3F-2, Lockheed PV-2D, and Stinson L-5. Aircraft flown out of harm's way in advance included their B-17, B-25, DC-3, P-47, F6F, F4U, SBD, PT-17, T-6 and the F8F.  Most of the airworthy planes were flown out of the museum prior to the hurricane.  Those remaining as well as the static displays were largely destroyed or heavily damaged. The TB-58 went to Little Rock Air Force Base. The PBY-5A and the PB4Y-2 went to the Pima Air & Space Museum.

TF-51 crash

On October 23, 2013 a P-51 (TF-51) Mustang owned by the museum crashed in Halls Lake, just south west of the museum. Both the pilot and a paying passenger from the UK were killed in the crash.

Move to Houston

Following the destruction of Hurricane Ike, the museum made the decision to move to Ellington International Airport in Houston. It is working with the Collings Foundation and Texas Flying Legends to create a combined aviation museum complex. In March 2014, the museum received $7.6 million from FEMA. The museum broke ground at its new location on November 9, 2015. Initially scheduled to be dedicated on September 1, 2017, the opening was postponed to September 16 due to Hurricane Harvey.

The museum acquired a former NASA Motion Base Simulator from Texas A&M University.

Exhibits
The museum has featured exhibits on the September 11th attacks and Women Airforce Service Pilots.

Texas Aviation Hall of Fame
The Texas Aviation Hall of Fame, located within the museum, honors the contributions of residents or natives of Texas to aviation and spaceflight. Inductees include Howard Hughes, Gordon Bethune, Emma Carter Browning, Alan Bean, Senator Lloyd Bentsen, Azellia White and President George H. W. Bush.

Airshows
The museum's collection often participates in airshows across the country. As of 2005, the museum's aircraft annually log more than 40,000 miles (60,000 km) of cross-country flying to various air demonstrations.

The museum's P-47 Thunderbolt participates in USAF Heritage Flights throughout the year. The USAF Heritage Flight program was established in 1997 to commemorate the Air Force's 50th anniversary. It involves today's state-of-the-art fighters flying in close formation with World War II, Korean and Vietnam era fighters such as the P-51 Mustang and the F-86 Sabre. The flight's mission is to safely and proudly display the evolution of US Air Force airpower and to support the Air Force's recruiting and retention efforts.

The museum's North American B-25 Mitchell also serves closely with the Disabled American Veterans program. The DAV Airshow Outreach Program was developed to increase public awareness of disabled veterans and to serve veterans in communities across the nation. Using two B-25 medium bombers, the program reminds the public of the sacrifices veterans have made.

In 2007, the museum launched its newest program by offering rides in some of its warbirds. The LSFM now operates flights for passengers in the B-17 Flying Fortress, North American B-25 Mitchell, T-6 Texan and the PT-17 Stearman.

The Museum also has a flying Douglas DC-3 in the paint scheme of Continental Airlines. The Museum's DC-3 was produced in 1940 and flew seven years for American Airlines. It was later bought by TransTexas Airways, which would later acquire Continental Airlines. When Gordon Bethune, CEO of Continental Airlines, was inducted into the TAHF in 2004, Continental Airlines donated the aircraft to the Flight Museum.

Collection 

 Boeing N2S-3 Kaydet 7718

 Boeing N2S-5 Kaydet 38490

 Cessna 172E Skyhawk – It has been converted to T-41 configuration.

 Douglas DC-3 2213

 Douglas SBD-5A/A24B Army Banshee 42-54682 – It is painted as an SBD.

 Fairchild PT-19 Cornell

 General Motors TBM Avenger 53575 – It was damaged by Hurricane Ike on September 13, 2008.

 Lockheed T-33 Shooting Star 51-6953

 North American B-25J Mitchell 44-86734  44-86734

 North American SNJ-5 Texan 85053

 Piper L-4 Grasshopper

 Vought F4U-5N Corsair 121881

See also
 North American aviation halls of fame

References

Further reading

Magazine

External links

 Lone Star Flight Museum

Aerospace museums in Texas
Military and war museums in Texas
Ellington Airport (Texas)